Floro may refer to:

People 
 Florentino Floro (born 1953), Filipino judge disbarred for mental illness
 Benito Floro (born 1952), Spanish football manager
 Dylan Floro (born 1990), baseball player 
 Gilles Floro (1964–1999), French Antillean zouk-love singer
 Floro Dery, Filipino illustrator
 Floro Díaz (1906–?), Argentine fencer in the 1948 Olympics
 Floro Bogado (1939–2017), Argentine politician

Places 
 Florø, a town in Norway
 San Floro, a town in Italy

Other uses 
 Floro International Corporation, a Filipino arms manufacturer
 Floronic Man, a plant/human hybrid character in DC Comics